Kathleen Buhle (formerly Kathleen Biden; born December 5, 1969) is an American non-profit executive and writer. Buhle is the former wife of Hunter Biden, a son of U.S. President Joe Biden. She is the author of the 2022 memoir If We Break: A Memoir of Marriage, Addiction, and Healing, which details her life while married to him.

Early life and education 
Buhle was born in Chicago, Illinois, into a middle-class Catholic family. Her mother was a schoolteacher and her father was a salesman for the Chicago White Sox. She was educated in Catholic schools and graduated from St. Mary's University, Texas, with a degree in psychology.

Later life 
In July 1992, Buhle met Hunter Biden, son of then-Senator Joe Biden and Neilia Hunter Biden, while the two were working as Jesuit volunteers at a Catholic church in Portland, Oregon. Buhle became pregnant three months into their relationship, and the two married in July 1993. Biden and Buhle moved to Washington, D.C., where her husband was a law student at Georgetown University. She gave birth to their first daughter, Naomi, on December 21, 1993. The family later settled in Wilmington, Delaware, and, in 1997, bought an estate dating back before the American Revolution. Buhle's brother-in-law, Beau Biden, moved in with them while he worked as a federal prosecutor in Philadelphia. In September 1998, she gave birth to their second daughter, Finnegan. In 2001, she gave birth to their third daughter, Maisy. The family moved back to Washington, D.C., and rented a house in Tenleytown. When her father-in-law and step-mother-in-law Jill Biden were respectively serving as vice president and second lady of the United States, Buhle became close friends with First Lady Michelle Obama.

In 2015, Buhle and Biden formally separated due to Biden's alcoholism and drug addictions. On December 9, 2016, Buhle filed for a divorce, and on February 23, 2017, she filed a motion in the Superior Court of the District of Columbia, seeking to freeze Biden's assets. She accused her estranged husband of creating "financial concerns for the family by spending extravagantly on his own interests", claiming that he spent money on drugs, alcohol, strip clubs, prostitutes, and gifts for women whom he became involved with. During this time, her husband began an affair with his brother's widow Hallie Olivere Biden. Their divorce was finalized later that year. In 2019, she formally changed her surname from Biden back to her maiden name, Buhle.

She authored a memoir titled If We Break: A Memoir of Marriage, Addiction, and Healing about her marriage to Biden and his drug addiction. The book came out in June 2022.

Personal life 
Buhle lives in Washington, D.C., where she started a women's club to assist people in need.

References

Living people
Writers from Chicago
Clubwomen
Catholics from Illinois
Kathleen
American nonprofit executives
American women memoirists
Women nonprofit executives
Hunter Biden
St. Mary's University, Texas alumni
20th-century American women
21st-century American memoirists
Date of birth missing (living people)
Year of birth missing (living people)